Sašo Zdravevski (born 11 August 1973) is a retired Macedonian football defender, who was last played for FK Pelister.

International career
He made his senior debut for Macedonia in a March 2000 friendly match against Bosnia & Herzegovina and has earned a total of 6 caps, scoring no goals. His final international was an April 2003 friendly against Portugal.

References

External sources

1973 births
Living people
Sportspeople from Bitola
Association football defenders
Macedonian footballers
North Macedonia international footballers
FK Pelister players
FK Sileks players
FK Makedonija Gjorče Petrov players
FK Sloga Jugomagnat players
FK Pobeda players
Yugoslav First League players
Macedonian First Football League players
Macedonian Second Football League players